"¡El pueblo unido jamás será vencido!" (English: "The people united will never be defeated") is one of the most internationally renowned songs of the Nueva canción chilena (New Chilean Song) movement. The music of the song was composed by Sergio Ortega and the text written by Quilapayún. The song was composed and recorded in June 1970.

History 
The song was initially composed as an anthem for the popular unity government, reflecting the spirit behind the mass mobilization of working-class people who in 1970 had elected Salvador Allende for the socialist transformation of Chile. During Allende's campaign El pueblo unido jamás será vencido was a frequent slogan. The song was interpreted and recorded by a number of music groups shortly after it was composed and performed publicly by Sergio Ortega and Quilapayún. New Chilean Song music ensembles such as Vientos del Pueblo, Inti-illimani among others, made successful recordings of the song that filled the airways and the backgrounds of political rallies. After the U.S.-backed September 11, 1973 Chilean coup the song became the anthem of the Chilean resistance against the Pinochet regime, both within Chile and among the community of Chilean exiles and their political allies abroad.

However, it was especially after Pinochet's September 1973 coup that the Chilean group Inti-Illimani made it famous around the world, after they published the song in the album La Nueva Canción Chilena.

During the course of time the song has been used in various protests around the world against either left or right-wing dictatorships, most of which have no direct connection to the Chilean coup or Latin America. The lyrics have been adapted or translated into many languages.

Versions 
In a more militant version, the phrase El pueblo unido jamás será vencido is changed in the last verse to El pueblo armado jamás será aplastado — "The people armed will never be crushed".
In Portugal, especially from 1974 to 1977, pro-democracy, populist, centrist and left-wing groups (especially communists) sang a song called Portugal Ressuscitado (Resurrected Portugal), written by Ary dos Santos and sung by Fernando Tordo and an accompanying chorus. The song was recorded immediately after the Carnation Revolution with the famous encore Agora o Povo Unido nunca mais será vencido (Now the People United will never more be defeated). The song, though, had only very small similarities with the tune of the Chilean song during most of its structure except during the similar encore, and no lyrical similarity besides the spirit of popular struggle and the similar catchphrase/slogan. The song and the slogan are still quite popular and part of Portuguese collective memory.
In Iran, the melody was used for a revolutionary song with Persian lyrics, entitled "Barpakhiz" (in English "Arise"), with encore !بر پا خیز، از جا کن، بنای کاخ دشمن (Pronounced as Barpakhiz, az ja kan, banaye kakh-e doshman, Meaning: Arise, Demolish the Foundations of the Enemy's Palace!) by the Iranian leftist revolutionaries during the Revolution against the monarchy in 1979. The song has experienced a revival in popularity with the Iranian Green revolution as a rally and protest song.
In the Philippines, the song was loosely translated by the progressive band Patatag for their song "Awit ng Tagumpay" (which translates to "Song of Victory") with its Tagalog encore "Tibayin ang hanay, Gapiin ang Kaaway!" (Strengthen the ranks, destroy the oppressors).  It is sung during demonstrations. The Bagong Alyansang Makabayan also used its loosely Tagalog translation of the title as its motto: "Ang tao, ang bayan, ngayon ay lumalaban!"
In 1975 Frederic Rzewski composed 36 piano variations on this song.
In 1977, the German folk singer Hannes Wader released the song "El pueblo unido" on the live album "Hannes Wader singt Arbeiterlieder" recorded at a folk festival organized by the DKP newspaper Unsere Zeit.
In 1978 the Italian singer and composer Gianfranco Molle released the album "Horo da opozicio" with an Esperanto version of the song translated by Renato Corsetti.  
In 1979, "The People United Will Never Be Defeated!" was chanted at the White Night riots after the sentencing of former San Francisco supervisor Dan White in the murders of George Moscone and Harvey Milk. White only served 5 years of a 7-year sentence.
 In 1982, the American bassist Charlie Haden recorded a version with Carla Bley and the Liberation Music Orchestra on the album Ballad of the Fallen which was voted top jazz album of the year in Downbeat's 1984 critics' poll.
 In 1983, during the "Resistance March" (Marcha de la resistencia) in Argentina, the song was revived with the lyrics "Ahora! Ahora! Resulta indispensable! Aparición con vida y castigo a los culpables" ("Now! Now! It's essential that they return the disappeared, and that the guilty be punished"). The song was still being sung in the 2000s in Argentina with the disappearance of Julio Lopez. 
In 1990, Turkish rock band Bulutsuzluk Ozlemi released the song "Şili'ye Özgürlük" (which translates to "Freedom to Chile") on their second album "Uçtu Uçtu". The song is included lyrics "El pueblo unido jamás será vencido".
In the second half of 1990s, Turkish protest band Grup Yorum occasionally interpreted the tune with a different set of anti-fascist lyrics. 
In 1995 the Hungarian Ska group Szabad Idők (Free Times) released the song "El Pueblo Unido" on their album Vivan Los Zapatistas!.  El Pueblo Unido included lyrics inspired by the Chilean song.
In 1998 the British electronic music trio Dario G used the phrase in the song "Revolution".
In 2002 Russian singer Garik Sukachov used the phrase in his song "Svobodu Andzhele Devis" ("freedom for Angela Davis").
In 2002 the Spanish group Ska-p released the song "Estampida" on their album ¡¡Que Corra La Voz!!.  Estampida included lyrics inspired by the Chilean song.
in 2003 the group Anti-Flag used the English translation "The people united will never be defeated" as chorus in the song "One People, One Struggle" from the album "The Terror State".
In 2004 Ukrainian rap band GreenJolly paraphrased this song to create "Razom nas bahato" ("Together We Are Many") during the first days of Orange Revolution. This song was the Ukraine's entry at the 2005 Eurovision Song Contest.
 In 2007, during the Greek general elections, the song was used during the main campaign of the left party SYRIZA (Coalition of the Radical Left) and it figured on the party's televised message.
In 2008, Thievery Corporation released "El pueblo unido" on the album Radio Retaliation, which is based on this quote.
 In the protests in Tunis in 2010 and 2011 that led to the ousting of president Ben Ali, protesters chanted on the same rhythm the phrase "الشعب يريد إسقاط النظام" (Ash-shab yurid isqat an-nizam) which translates to "The people want the regime down". The same phrase was chanted for the first time in Tahrir square in Egypt on 25 January 2011 in what turned into massive protests that lead to the ousting of president Hosni Mubarak. Eventually, the protest slogan became the unofficial slogan of protesters throughout the Arab Spring.
The 2012 Flobots album The Circle in the Squares titular track uses this line in its lyrics.
The 2013 song "Control" by Big Sean featuring Kendrick Lamar and Jay Electronica samples the recording by Sergio Ortega and Quilapayún
 In 2014, during the Sunflower Student Movement in Taiwan, this song was translated to Chinese as "" by Huáng Sī-nóng and Jiăng Tāo.
The 2015 song El Pueblo Unido by Austrian ska-punk band Russkaja uses the line from original song in the chorus.
In 2016, in the student protests that rocked Jawaharlal Nehru University, New Delhi against the sedition cases filed by the ruling Hindu nationalist BJP government, the PhD scholar and JNUSU President Kanhaiya Kumar, raised this slogan in the protests.
In the 30 June 2018 Families Belong Together Marches, the title of the song was frequently chanted during demonstrations.
On 28 September 2019, during the 2019–20 Hong Kong protests, protesters sang a Cantonese version in Central, Hong Kong.
During the 2019–20 Latin American protests which began from the home of the slogan, it became a resistance motto for protesters in both Chile, Honduras, Argentina, Bolivia, Guatemala, Colombia, Mexico, Ecuador, Paraguay, Nicaragua, Peru, Haiti, El Salvador, Brazil and Venezuela calling to end the corruption of governments and caudillism.
In 2022, the rapper Linqua Franqa used the phrase in their song "Wurk".
In 2022, Turkish-Kurdish music band Geniş Merdiven ("Wide Staircase") taking its name from Mikis Theodorakis's song "O Antonis" made an adaptation translation into Turkish and began to sing in concerts with an interlude in Spanish.

See also
Ash-shab yurid isqat an-nizam

References

External links
 Lyrics and translation of lyrics
 Another English translation
 Basque version

Nueva canción
Spanish-language songs
Protest songs
1973 songs
Political catchphrases
Political songs
Communist songs